Kiyo Murashima (October 1892 – 11 March 1982) was a Japanese politician. She was one of the first group of women elected to the House of Representatives in 1946.

Biography
Murashima was born in Niigata Prefecture in 1892. She then returned to Niigata and worked as a dormitory supervisor at Niigata Prefectural High School for Girls and became a member of the Personal Affairs Mediation Committee.

Murashima contested the 1946 general elections (the first in which women could vote) as a Japan Progressive Party candidate, and was elected to the House of Representatives. In March 1947 the Progressive Party merged into the Democratic Party and Murashima failed to gain nomination as a candidate for the new party in the April 1947 elections. She subsequently worked as a mediator for Niigata family court and died in 1982.

References

1892 births
20th-century Japanese women politicians
20th-century Japanese politicians
Japan Progressive Party politicians
Members of the House of Representatives (Japan)
1982 deaths